The string drum or Tambourin de Béarn (in German) is a long rectangular box zither beaten with a mallet. It is paired with a one-handed flute (French: galoubet) with three finger holes, similar to a pipe and tabor. It has also been called tambourin de Gascogne, tambourin à cordes in Catalan, Pyrenean string drum, ttun-ttun in Basque , salmo in Spanish, and chicotén in Aragonese. It was known in the middle ages as the choron or chorus.

In specific usage, this name denotes a form of long psaltery-styled instrument that is tuned to provide drone chords when drummed. It can be found in a similar body shape with three to eight strings. The tuning is often held in root, tonic and dominant, or root and fifth. That with one Psaltery-related instrument is easy to play because the strings are struck with a mallet as a whole.
 
The name salterio or psalterium for the instrument comes from the Yebra, Spain. Researcher Violet Alford said that it was a mistake to include the stringed drum under the name of psalterium, the latin name of a strummed or plucked instrument.

Curt Sachs described the Tambourine de Bearn as being from South France, a "longitudinal zither with thick gut strings tune to tonic and dominant." The effect was two tones at the same time perceived together as a chorus.

It has 5 or six strings tuned in 5ths.

Method
It is slung on the arm or over the shoulder of a player who uses the same hand to play the pipe, while striking the strings with a linen covered stick held in the other hand. The 6 strings (3 sets) are most often tuned in octaves that match the keynote of the tabor pipe, and can be played pianissimo as well as forte.

Extent and uses
According to Jeremy Montagu, the string drums were in continuous use through the middle ages, seen in iconography.

The instrument is currently widespread in the western Pyrenees, and it bears the hallmark of the territory. Apparently invented in the 15th century, it came into use in the Pyrenees, where it took hold. It is popular in the easternmost Basque province of Soule (Zuberoa), where it provides along with the three hole flute (xirula) the necessary musical background for traditional dance performances and the carnival set of performances called maskarada, which takes place on a yearly basis in different villages of the former viscounty.

After losing ground during the 20th century in western and central Pyrenees, namely Bigorre, Béarn and Soule, the practice of the three hole flute and tambourin came almost to a halt after World War II, except for the Ossau Valley in Béarn. Evidence has been gathered also that with different names (such as salterio) it was played along with the flute early in the 20th century in small areas of High Aragon. From the 1970s on, the instrument has shown renewed vitality.

Construction
It is a very simple form of psaltery or box zither, made of a wooden sounding box, with strings stretched from end to end, lengthwise. Its construction is similar to that of the Aeolian harp or Appalachian dulcimer. The Pyrenean version of the instrument numbers 4 to 10 strings but 3 sets of 2 (6 total) is the common arrangement.

See also
Guitar zither
Hammered dulcimer
Pipe and tabor
Psaltery
Ütőgardon, a Hungarian string drum shaped like a cello

References

External links
Academic paper with numerous medieval artworks showing string drums.
How to build a psalterium.
Ttun-ttun performance featured by M.Etxekopar

Box zithers
Early musical instruments
Basque musical instruments
European percussion instruments

ca:Salteri
de:Psalterium
sv:Psalterium (musikinstrument)